A whiteboard (also known by the terms marker board, dry-erase board, dry-wipe board, and pen-board) is a glossy, usually white surface for making non-permanent markings. Whiteboards are analogous to blackboards, but with a smoother surface allowing for rapid marking and erasing of markings on their surface. The popularity of whiteboards increased rapidly in the mid-1990s and they have become a fixture in many offices, meeting rooms, school classrooms, and other work environments.

The term whiteboard is also used metaphorically in reference to features of computer software applications that simulate whiteboards. Such "virtual tech whiteboards" allow one or more people to write or draw images on a simulated canvas. This is a common feature of many virtual meeting, collaboration, and instant messaging applications. The term whiteboard is also used to refer to interactive whiteboards.

History 

Photographer Martin Heit and Alliance employee Albert Stallion have been credited with the invention of the whiteboard.

Whiteboards became commercially available in the early 1960s, but did not become widely used until 30 years later. Early whiteboards needed to be wiped with a damp cloth and markers had a tendency to leave marks behind, even after erasing the board. Dry-erase markers for whiteboards were invented in 1975.

Whiteboards began being commonly used by businesses in the early 1990s. They became more common in classrooms during the 1990s due to concerns over health problems in children with dust allergies and the potential for chalk dust to damage computers. By the late 1990s, about 21% of American classrooms had converted from chalkboards to whiteboards.

Types 

The first whiteboards were very expensive and were made of an enameled steel. Cheaper versions were then produced, including laminated chipboard, high-pressure laminates and steel boards with a matte-finished or glossy white, usually polyester or acrylic, coating. Enameled whiteboards, also referred to as porcelain and sometimes glass boards, have the advantage that markings can be erased completely; other materials tend to become stained over time. Enameled boards are more expensive and less used in commercial environments, but in more demanding environments with heavier use, such as educational establishments, porcelain boards are considered superior.

Other types of dry marker boards are also available, such as high gloss vinyl and coated paper, which can be rolled up, high-density two-part high gloss paints, glass and coated acrylics and polypropylene magic whiteboards which use static electricity to cling to walls, windows, and doors.

Clear marker surfaces, made of glass (matte or glossy) or specially coated acrylic, became available around the mid-2000s. They are generally manufactured from technical glass, e.g. for monitor screen filters, which is optically coated.

Adhesive whiteboards 
Whiteboard material can be bought in rolls, sheets, and pre-formed boards. Adhesive whiteboards come in either a sheet or a roll and feature a stick back enabling the user to create a custom size board or project with the material. Although adhesive whiteboard material does not come in a thick, hard glass or painted steel plate, the melamine allows for a flexible material while preserving the high-quality whiteboard attributes of other surface materials. Adhesive whiteboards allow for custom projects such as dry erase wall calendars, whiteboard tables, cupboard grocery lists, indoor games for kids, and more.

Erasable marker 
One type of whiteboard pen (also called a whiteboard marker or dry erase marker) was invented by Jerry Woolf of Techform Laboratories and later patented by Pilot Pen in 1975. It is a non-permanent marker and uses an erasable ink that adheres to the writing surface without binding to or being absorbed by it. Applications range from temporary writing with acetate sheets (for use with overhead projectors) to whiteboards and similar glossy surfaces. The erasable ink does not contain the toxic chemical compounds xylene and/or toluene, unlike permanent markers.

Surface materials 
There are six types of materials commonly used for whiteboard surfaces:

 Melamine
 A resin-infused paper which is typically used over a substrate that can range from particle board to MDF (medium density fiberboard).  Melamine boards range in quality primarily because of the amount of resin deposited on the base material.  Some melamine boards remain clean (no ghosting) for a long time, others less so.  Generally, this least expensive type of whiteboard is most commonly found in use in non-institutional applications.  They are available in any office supply store. Performance varies widely. These boards are not suitable for heavy use, as in many educational cases, with time the paint erodes and the original surface reappears.

 Steel or aluminum
 Painted steel and aluminum dry erase also have a wide range of quality.  Painted surfaces tend to be smoother, which leads to better methods of erasing.  The painted surface is generally a multiple layer of coatings made up of a base coat in color (most commonly white) and a clear performance coating that is the dry erase component.  Paint varies from electron beam cured coatings to UV and other coating systems.  Good commercial grade painted steel or aluminum has excellent dry erase properties and many will be able to have permanent marker cleaned from the surface.  Any coated surface is susceptible to scratching.  Painted steel surfaces are magnetic and allow the use of magnets. Painted aluminum surfaces are rarely used as a base for whiteboards as they are not magnetic and are more expensive than steel.  Painted steel whiteboards are most commonly used for custom printed whiteboards.  These products are used as tracking boards, patient information boards and tournament and training boards.

 Hardcoat laminate
 Here again the performance varies over a wide range depending on the amount of resin used in the manufacturer.  This category primarily uses melamine as its dry erase performance coat.  Depending on the manufacturer (and the price) these laminates often are less porous and highly resistant to staining. Less common than other whiteboard surfaces, because they usually are used in combination with something else (a cabinet, doors or table tops for example). (This statement applies to Porcelain steel which is the only lifetime warranty available on the market)

 Porcelain, enamel-on-steel
 Ceramic fired onto a steel surface in a kiln.  They are the most durable surfaces, and most carry a lifetime warranty.  They are very common in heavy-use industrial settings. They are highly scratch-resistant, although materials harder than glass, such as diamond, can scratch them. They do not absorb dry erase or permanent marker ink.  They allow the use of magnets.  The surface can be cleaned with any non-abrasive cleaner suitable for porcelain, then rinsed off with water to prevent smearing.  Permanent marker can be removed using a polar solvent such as ethanol, isopropanol or acetone, or by writing over it with a dry-erase marker and erasing it.

 Tempered glass
 Tempered glass is easier to erase.  Most tempered glass white boards have no frame.

 Polypropylene film
 Polypropylene film is temporary and uses static electricity to cling to existing surfaces. It works with dry whiteboard markers and wipes. Whiteboards are reusable and materials are recyclable.

See also 
Display board
Interactive whiteboard
Grease pencil
Flip chart
Album (Ancient Rome), a board chalked or painted white, on which public notices were inscribed in black

References

External links 
 

Educational devices
Office equipment
Writing media